David Walter Phillipson FBA FSA (born 17 October 1942) is a British archaeologist specializing in African archaeology. His most notable work has been in Ethiopia, particularly on the archaeology of Aksumite sites. He was curator of the Museum of Archaeology and Anthropology, University of Cambridge from 1981–2006, and Fellow of Gonville and Caius College, Cambridge, 1988–2006.

Selected publications
 African Archaeology
 Foundations of an African Civilisation: Aksum and the northern Horn, 1000 BC - AD 1300
 Ancient Churches of Ethiopia. Yale University Press, New Haven, 2009.

References 
 ‘PHILLIPSON, Prof. David Walter’, Who's Who 2013, A & C Black, an imprint of Bloomsbury Publishing plc, 2013; online edn, Oxford University Press, Dec 2012 ; online edn, Nov 2012 accessed 5 March 2013

External links 

 https://www.cai.cam.ac.uk/people/david-phillipson

1942 births
Living people
British archaeologists
Fellows of Gonville and Caius College, Cambridge
Fellows of the British Academy
Fellows of the Society of Antiquaries of London
20th-century archaeologists
21st-century archaeologists